Lucien Prudhomme (20 April 1891 – 23 March 1960) was a French racing cyclist. He rode in the 1924 Tour de France.

References

1891 births
1960 deaths
French male cyclists
Place of birth missing